Fifty Shades is a British-American film trilogy series based on the Fifty Shades trilogy by English author E. L. James. It is distributed by Universal Studios and stars Dakota Johnson and Jamie Dornan as the lead roles Anastasia Steele and Christian Grey, respectively. Sam Taylor-Johnson directed the first film, and James Foley directed the second and third films.

The first film, Fifty Shades of Grey, was released on February 13, 2015, while the second, Fifty Shades Darker, was released on February 10, 2017. Fifty Shades Freed, the third film, was released on February 9, 2018. Although the films were poorly received critically, the series grossed over $1.32 billion worldwide, making it the seventh highest-grossing R-rated franchise of all-time.

Development
Two years after the trilogy's first novel was released, several distribution companies had bid for the rights of the trilogy. Warner Bros., Sony, Paramount and Universal, as well as Mark Wahlberg's production company, put in bids for the film rights. The winning bid went to Universal Studios and Focus Features, at $5 million. With James gaining control over the process of the making of the film, she hand-picked Dana Brunetti and Michael De Luca as the producers.

Films

Fifty Shades of Grey (2015)

When Anastasia "Ana" Steele, a literature student, goes to interview the wealthy Christian Grey, as a favor to her roommate Kate Kavanagh, she encounters a handsome, brilliant and intimidating man. The innocent and naive Ana, startled to realize she wants him, despite his enigmatic reserve and advice, finds herself desperate to get close to him. Not able to resist Ana's beauty and independent spirit, Grey admits he wants her too, but on his own terms. Ana hesitates as she discovers the singular tastes of Grey; despite the embellishments of success – his multinational businesses, his vast wealth, his loving family – Grey is consumed by the need to control everything. As they get close, Steele starts to discover Grey's secrets and explores her own BDSM desires.

Fifty Shades Darker (2017)

Following the events of the first film, Anastasia Steele and Christian Grey resume their relationship under Ana's terms. However, their relationship is tested when Christian's past threatens the couple.

Fifty Shades Freed (2018)

Believing they've left behind the shadowy figures from the past, billionaire Christian Grey and his new wife, Anastasia, fully embrace their inextricable connection and shared life of luxury. Just as the Greys begin to step into their new roles, sinister events come to light and jeopardize their happy ending before it even begins.

Cast and crew

Cast

Crew

Production

Directors
On June 19, 2013, Sam Taylor-Johnson was chosen to direct the first film. On February 6, 2015, Taylor-Johnson announced the sequels, prompting she would return to direct the sequels. It was later revealed that Taylor-Johnson would not return. On August 20, 2015, it was revealed by Deadline Hollywood that James Foley was the front-runner to direct the sequel and third film Fifty Shades Freed.

Screenwriters
Kelly Marcel was chosen as the screenwriter for the first film.

On April 22, 2015, it was announced that author E.L. James' husband, Niall Leonard, would write the script for the sequel. Leonard also went on to write the script for the third film.

Casting
The casting for the lead roles was considered controversial. Many contenders considered for the film included Ryan Gosling, Garrett Hedlund, Theo James, Alexander Skarsgård, François Arnaud, Charlie Hunnam, Scott Eastwood, Luke Bracey, Ian Somerhalder and Billy Magnussen as Christian Grey. Alicia Vikander, Imogen Poots, Elizabeth Olsen, Shailene Woodley, Alexis Bledel and Felicity Jones were all considered for the role of Anastasia Steele.

On September 2, 2013, Dakota Johnson and Charlie Hunnam were cast as Anastasia Steele and Christian Grey respectively. As a result, the displeasure of the casting from fans caused controversy. In response, Brunetti stated, "There is a lot that goes into casting that isn't just looks. Talent, availability, their desire to do it, chemistry with other actor, etc. So if your favorite wasn't cast, then it is most likely due to something on that list. Keep that in mind while hating and keep perspective." On October 12, it was announced Hunnam had quit the role of Grey and the studio was in the process of searching for a new actor. On October 23, Jamie Dornan was cast as the replacement for Christian Grey.

In October 2013, Jennifer Ehle was cast as Carla Wilks. On October 31, 2013, Victor Rasuk was cast as José Rodriguez, Jr. On November 22, 2013, Eloise Mumford was cast as Kate Kavanagh. On December 2, 2013, singer Rita Ora was cast as Christian's younger sister Mia. On December 3, 2013, Marcia Gay Harden was cast as Christian's mother, Grace.

On January 28, 2016, Kim Basinger joined the franchise to play the role of Elena Lincoln in the sequels, Grey's business partner and former lover, while Luke Grimes, Eloise Mumford and Max Martini would be returning for the sequels. On February 5, Bella Heathcote was cast as Leila, one of Grey's former submissives. In the same month, Eric Johnson was cast to play Jack Hyde, Ana's boss at SIP. On February 18, 2016, Robinne Lee and Fay Masterson joined the film's cast. On February 20, Brant Daugherty signed on to play Luke Sawyer, the personal bodyguard for Anastasia in the third film.

Filming
For Fifty Shades of Grey, principal photography was filmed in Vancouver, British Columbia, Canada, which began on December 1, 2013. Scenes were filmed in the Gastown district of Vancouver. Bentall 5 was used as the Grey Enterprises building. The University of British Columbia serves as Washington State University Vancouver, from which Ana graduates. The Fairmont Hotel Vancouver was used as the Heathman Hotel. The film was also shot at the North Shore Studios. The production officially ended on February 21, 2014. Reshoots involving scenes between Dornan and Johnson took place in Vancouver during the week of October 13, 2014.

For Fifty Shades Darker and Fifty Shades Freed, principal photography was to commence in June in Vancouver, British Columbia, Canada. This was later to be impossible, due to the script being unwritten at that moment. In November 2015, Universal Studios announced that both films would be shot back-to-back with principal photography scheduled to commence in early 2016. Filming began in Paris and Vancouver from February 9, 2016, to July 12, 2016, under the working title "Further Adventures of Max and Banks 2 & 3." Filming on Fifty Shades Darker concluded on April 11, 2016.

Reception

With a combined worldwide gross over $1.3 billion, the franchise was one of the biggest R-rated franchises ever, behind only The Matrix ($1.6 billion over three films), The Hangover ($1.4 billion over three films) and Alien ($1.328 billion not counting the PG-13 Alien vs. Predator).

Box office performance

Critical and public response

Accolades

References

Notes

External links

 Fifty Shades 

American film series
BDSM in films
Fifty Shades (film series)
Film series introduced in 2015
Film series based on British novels
Universal Pictures franchises
Works based on Twilight (novel series)
Erotic film series